David Houston may refer to:

 David Houston (1841–1906), American inventor issued the first patent for a roll film holder
 David F. Houston (1866–1940), American politician, Secretary of Agriculture and the Treasury under President Wilson
 G. David Houston (1880–1940), professor of English at Howard University
 David Houston (singer) (1935–1993), American country music singer
 David Houston (footballer) (born 1948), Scottish footballer and manager
 David Houston, British Army officer and Lord Lieutenant of Sutherland, 1992–2005
 David Houston (zoologist) (fl. 1999), British zoologist